Constantin Nour (June 13, 1906 or June 15, 1907, Tiraspol - November 17, 1986) was a Romanian champion middleweight boxer and national team trainer.

In 1926, he won the Romanian national championship in the middleweight category.

Nour, who was a so-called Honored Trainer ("Antrenor emerit"), trained both the Romanian national junior and the senior teams.

Disciples 
Olympic champions Nicolae Linca and Ion Monea
Olympic silver medal winners Mircea Şimon and Mircea Dobrescu
European triple champion (flyweight, super flyweight and bantamweight) Lucian Popescu

Legacy
His old club, Dinamo Bucharest, has a boxing gym named in his honor.

Professional boxing record

|-
|align="center" colspan=8|10 Wins (6 knockouts, 3 decisions, 1 disqualification), 16 Losses (3 knockouts, 11 decisions 2 disqualifications), 4 Draws 
|-
| align="center" style="border-style: none none solid solid; background: #e3e3e3"|Result
| align="center" style="border-style: none none solid solid; background: #e3e3e3"|Record
| align="center" style="border-style: none none solid solid; background: #e3e3e3"|Opponent
| align="center" style="border-style: none none solid solid; background: #e3e3e3"|Type
| align="center" style="border-style: none none solid solid; background: #e3e3e3"|Round
| align="center" style="border-style: none none solid solid; background: #e3e3e3"|Date
| align="center" style="border-style: none none solid solid; background: #e3e3e3"|Location
| align="center" style="border-style: none none solid solid; background: #e3e3e3"|Notes
|-
|Loss
|
|align=left| Dumitru Călinescu
|DQ
|2 
|1934-10-31		
|align=left| Timișoara, Romania
|align=left|
|-
|Loss
|
|align=left| Dumitru Pavelescu
|PTS
|10 
|1932-02-27		
|align=left| Sidoli Circus, Bucharest, Romania
|align=left|
|-
|Loss
|
|align=left| Mihai Fulea
|KO
|3 
|1931-05-09		
|align=left| Bucharest, Romania
|align=left|
|-
|Draw
|
|align=left| Auguste Lengagne
|PTS
|10 
|1930-05-15	
|align=left| Boulogne-sur-Mer, France
|align=left|
|-
|Loss
|
|align=left| Maurice Kunter
|DQ
|1 
|1930-05-10		
|align=left| Central Sporting Club, Paris, France
|align=left|
|-
|Loss
|
|align=left| Emile Caulier
|TKO
|10 
|1930-03-22		
|align=left| Central Sporting Club, Paris, France
|align=left|
|-
|Loss
|
|align=left| Mihai Fulea
|PTS
|10 
|1929-12-14		
|align=left| Bucharest, Romania
|align=left|
|-
|Draw
|
|align=left| Mihai Fulea
|PTS
|10 
|1929-11-16		
|align=left| Bucharest, Romania
|align=left|
|-
|Win
|
|align=left| Martin Franchi
|PTS
|10 
|1929-06-09		
|align=left| Bucharest, Romania
|align=left|
|-
|Win
|
|align=left| Ali Sadek
|PTS
|10 
|1929-05-25		
|align=left| Bucharest, Romania
|align=left|
|-
|Loss
|
|align=left| Motzi Spakow
|PTS
|10 
|1929-04-20		
|align=left| Bucharest, Romania
|align=left|
|-
|Loss
|
|align=left| Michel Riond
|PTS
|10 
|1929-03-16		
|align=left| Bucharest, Romania
|align=left|
|-
|Loss
|
|align=left| Louis Legras
|PTS
|8 
|1929-02-16		
|align=left| Central Sporting Club, Paris, France
|align=left|
|-
|Win
|
|align=left| Louis Legras
|DQ
|3 
|1929-02-02		
|align=left| Central Sporting Club, Paris, France
|align=left|
|-
|Win
|
|align=left| Henri Barras
|PTS
|10 
|1929-01-19		
|align=left| Central Sporting Club, Paris, France
|align=left|
|-
|Draw
|
|align=left| Motzi Spakow
|PTS
|10 
|1928-12-08		
|align=left| Bucharest, Romania
|align=left|
|-
|Loss
|
|align=left| Umberto Lancia
|PTS
|10 
|1928-09-13		
|align=left| Bucharest, Romania
|align=left|
|-
|Loss
|
|align=left| Dumitru Teica
|PTS
|10 
|1928-01-14		
|align=left| Bucharest, Romania
|align=left|
|-
|Draw
|
|align=left| Motzi Spakow
|PTS
|10 
|1927-11-23		
|align=left| Bucharest, Romania
|align=left|
|-
|Win
|
|align=left| Emile Romerio
|TKO
|2 
|1927-05-14		
|align=left| Bucharest, Romania
|align=left|
|-
|Loss
|
|align=left| Poldi Steinbach
|PTS
|10 
|1927-04-10		
|align=left| Bucharest, Romania
|align=left|
|-
|Win
|
|align=left| Dumitru Teica
|KO
|3 
|1927-02-27		
|align=left| Bucharest, Romania
|align=left|
|-
|Win
|
|align=left| Dumitru Teica
|KO
|2 
|1927-02-26		
|align=left| Bucharest, Romania
|align=left|
|-
|Loss
|
|align=left| Boris Alexeev
|KO
|1 
|1927-02-12		
|align=left| Bucharest, Romania
|align=left|
|-
|Loss
|
|align=left| Dumitru Teica
|PTS
|10 
|1927-01-19		
|align=left| Bucharest, Romania
|align=left| 
|-
|Loss
|
|align=left| Poldi Steinbach
|TKO
|5 
|1926-06-05		
|align=left| Bucharest, Romania
|align=left|
|-
|Loss
|
|align=left| Dumitru Teica
|PTS
|10 
|1926-04-01		
|align=left| Bucharest, Romania
|align=left|
|-
|Win
|
|align=left| Al Puggi
|KO
|2 
|1926-03-06		
|align=left| Bucharest, Romania
|align=left|
|-
|Win
|
|align=left| Umberto Lancia
|PTS
|6 
|1926-02-01		
|align=left| Bucharest, Romania
|align=left|
|-
|Win
|
|align=left| Gaspard Luiggi
|RTD
|1 
|1923-09-30		
|align=left| Galați, Romania
|align=left|
|}

Awards 
Honored Trainer ("Antrenor emerit")
In 1976, he was awarded the title Meritul Sportiv Cl. II ("The Sport Merit, Second Class").

References 

1986 deaths
Romanian boxing trainers
Middleweight boxers
People from Tiraspol
People from Kherson Governorate
1900s births
Romanian male boxers